María Teresa Prieto (18961982) was a Spanish composer who lived and worked in Mexico.

Life
María Teresa Prieto was born in Oviedo in 1896 to a middle-class Asturian family. She studied with pianist and composer Saturnino del Fresno in Asturias and Benito de la Parra at the Conservatory of Madrid. She went to stay with her brother Carlos in Mexico in 1937 during the Spanish Civil War where she studied with Manuel Ponce and Carlos Chavez. She also studied with Darius Milhaud at Mills College in Oakland, California, in 1946 and 1947. She returned to Spain briefly in 1958 to receive the Samuel Ross prize for Modal Quartet, but never returned to live there.

Works
Prieto's music was often based on folklore. Selected works include:

 Asturiana (1942) symphony
 Sinfonía breve (1945) symphony
 Sinfonía de la danza prima (1951) symphony
 Impresión sinfónica (1940) piano and symphony orchestra
 Palo verde (1967) ballet
 Cuadros de la naturaleza (1965–67) includes movements Asturias and El valle de México

Her work has been recorded and issued on CD, including:
 María Teresa Prieto: obra sinfónica (2005 and 2006) Diverdi

References

1896 births
1982 deaths
20th-century classical composers
Women classical composers
Spanish women classical composers
20th-century Spanish musicians
20th-century women composers
20th-century Spanish women
Spanish emigrants to Mexico